ICOC may refer to:

 International Churches of Christ, a global family/network of churches.
 International Code of Conduct against Ballistic Missile Proliferation, also known as the "Hague Code of Conduct"
 International Commission for Orders of Chivalry, a scholarly organization studying chivalric orders.
 International Code of Conduct for Private Security Service Providers

See also 
 ICC (disambiguation), listing many organizations whose names may also be abbreviated "ICOC"